Sageria is a genus of fungi in the family Helotiaceae. The genus contains xx species.

References 

Helotiaceae